Gradišica is a small village in the Municipality of Hrpelje-Kozina in the Littoral region of Slovenia.

Name
The name of the settlement was changed from Gradiščica to Gradišica in 1992.

Church
The local church is dedicated to the Virgin Mary and belongs to the Parish of Brezovica.

References

External links
Gradišica on Geopedia

Populated places in the Municipality of Hrpelje-Kozina